Jim Vechiarella (born February 20, 1937) is an American football coach who last served as interim defensive coordinator for the San Diego Chargers in 2001. He was defensive coordinator for the New York Jets from 1995 to 1996 under head coach Rich Kotite.

References

1937 births
Living people
Players of American football from Youngstown, Ohio
Coaches of American football from Ohio
Youngstown State Penguins football players
Charlotte Hornets (WFL) coaches
Tulane Green Wave football coaches
Los Angeles Rams coaches
Kansas City Chiefs coaches
New York Jets coaches
Cleveland Browns coaches
Philadelphia Eagles coaches
San Diego Chargers coaches
National Football League defensive coordinators